Tábor District is a district in the South Bohemian Region of the Czech Republic. Its capital is the town of Tábor.

Administrative division
Tábor District is divided into two administrative districts of municipalities with extended competence: Tábor and Soběslav.

List of municipalities
Towns are marked in bold and market towns in italics:

Balkova Lhota -
Bechyně -
Bečice -
Běleč -
Borkovice -
Borotín -
Bradáčov -
Březnice -
Budislav -
Černýšovice -
Chotěmice -
Chotoviny -
Choustník -
Chrbonín -
Chýnov -
Dírná -
Dlouhá Lhota -
Dobronice u Bechyně -
Dolní Hořice -
Dolní Hrachovice -
Dráchov -
Drahov -
Dražice -
Dražičky -
Drhovice -
Haškovcova Lhota -
Hlasivo -
Hlavatce -
Hodětín -
Hodonice -
Jedlany -
Jistebnice -
Katov -
Klenovice -
Komárov -
Košice -
Košín -
Krátošice -
Krtov -
Libějice -
Lom -
Malšice -
Mažice -
Meziříčí -
Mezná -
Mladá Vožice -
Mlýny -
Myslkovice -
Nadějkov -
Nasavrky -
Nemyšl -
Nová Ves u Chýnova -
Nová Ves u Mladé Vožice -
Oldřichov -
Opařany -
Planá nad Lužnicí -
Pohnánec -
Pohnání -
Pojbuky -
Přehořov -
Psárov -
Radenín -
Radětice -
Radimovice u Tábora -
Radimovice u Želče -
Radkov -
Rataje -
Ratibořské Hory -
Řemíčov -
Řepeč -
Řípec -
Rodná -
Roudná -
Šebířov -
Sedlečko u Soběslavě -
Sezimovo Ústí -
Skalice -
Skopytce -
Skrýchov u Malšic -
Slapsko -
Slapy -
Smilovy Hory -
Soběslav -
Stádlec -
Sudoměřice u Bechyně -
Sudoměřice u Tábora -
Sviny -
Svrabov -
Tábor -
Třebějice -
Tučapy -
Turovec -
Ústrašice -
Val -
Vesce -
Veselí nad Lužnicí -
Vilice -
Vlastiboř -
Vlčeves -
Vlkov -
Vodice -
Zadní Střítež -
Záhoří -
Zálší -
Želeč -
Zhoř u Mladé Vožice -
Zhoř u Tábora -
Žíšov
Zlukov -
Zvěrotice

Geography

Most of the territory is characterized by an undulating landscape that turns into the tectonic depression in the south. The territory extends into four geomorphological mesoregions: Tábor Uplands (west and centre), Vlašim Uplands (north), Křemešník Highlands (east) and Třeboň Basin (south).

The territory is rich in watercourses and ponds. The most important river is the Lužnice, which flows into the territory in the south, flows through it and turns to the southwest. In the south, the Nežárka flows into it. There are also many ponds in the rest of the district territory.

A small part of the protected landscape area of Třeboňsko extends into the district in the south.

Demographics

Most populated municipalities

Economy
The largest employers with its headquarters in Tábor District and at least 500 employers are:

Transport
The D3 motorway, part of European route E55 leading from Prague to České Budějovice, runs across the district.

Sights

The most important monuments in the district, protected as national cultural monuments, are:
Kozí hrádek Castle in Sezimovo Ústí
Old Town Hall in Tábor
Kotnov Castle and brewery in Tábor
Stádlec Suspension Bridge
Bechyně Bridge
Altar Wings of Roudníky
Monastery with the Church of the Assumption of the Virgin Mary in Tábor-Klokoty

The best-preserved settlements, protected as monument reservations and monument zones, are:

Tábor (monument reservation)
Klečaty (monument reservation)
Komárov (monument reservation)
Mažice (monument reservation)
Vlastiboř (monument reservation)
Zálší (monument reservation)
Záluží (monument reservation)
Bechyně
Soběslav
Bechyňská Smoleč
Debrník
Nedvědice
Ounuz
Svinky

The most visited tourist destinations are the Tábor Zoo and Hussite Museum in Tábor.

References

External links

Tábor District profile on the Czech Statistical Office's website

 
Districts of the Czech Republic